Mark Spicoluk is a Canadian musician, lifestyle content creator, and entrepreneur. He is best known as the vocalist and bassist for the punk rock band Closet Monster and, since 2014, working with his wife on their lifestyle brand/YouTube channel Boho Beautiful. From 2012 to 2015 he appeared as a judge on YTV's The Next Star. He is also known as the founder of the indie record label Underground Operations, playing bass with Avril Lavigne and his production credits on albums by artists such as Protest the Hero, Abandon All Ships, Stereos and DVBBS. Along with his musical and business accomplishments, he is also a strong animal rights and social justice advocate.

Career overview

Spicoluk founded and played bass for the band Closet Monster from 1997 until their last show in December 2005, and established the indie punk rock label Underground Operations in 1995. In the winter of 2002 Spicoluk began playing bass for Avril Lavigne and helped prepare the launch of her first album "Let Go." From 2007 until 2012 he was an A&R Representative, eventually becoming Head of A&R for Universal Music Canada as well as a personal A&R for Gene Simmons at Simmons Records. He has production credits on albums by Protest the Hero, Abandon All Ships and many others. Most recently Spicoluk has co-founded a new entertainment business service company called Cloud Empire.

Spicoluk appeared for two seasons on MuchMusic's reality show Disband from 2009–2011, and then judged on YTV's The Next Star for its last three seasons.

Activism and charity work

Spicoluk is a vegan, and has publicly supported and worked with several animals rights groups in Toronto, including Toronto Pig Save, Peta2 and Mercy for Animals. He has also appeared in a public service announcement for Finding Fido, and has hosted parties for Fuck Cancer, a Montreal-based organization devoted to cancer research.

Early bands

Spicoluk sang and played lead guitar in his first band, Public Display, formed with high school friends in 1995 under the name Special Ed. The band played shows all over Ontario, releasing a self-titled CD in 1996. After the band parted ways in 1997, Mark joined Sum 41 to play bass before leaving to form Closet Monster with another former Sum 41 member Jon Marshall.

Closet Monster

Spicoluk was the bassist and vocalist for the political punk band Closet Monster during its entire existence from 1997–2005. Over the course of 7 albums and countless tours of North America and Europe, Mark also co-wrote every song and co-produced every release. Closet Monster's lyrics focused on political and social issues such as human rights violations, gender equality, anti-capitalism, and strongly supported animal rights. The band reunited for one show in 2009 at Wakestock festival in Wasaga Beach, Ontario.

Avril Lavigne

Early in 2002, Spicoluk was hired to play bass in Avril Lavigne's band as well as help prepare the launch of her first album, Let Go. Appearing on TV shows such as Good Morning America, The Tonight Show with Jay Leno, Live with Regis and Kelly, The Late Late Show with Craig Kilborn, and in stadiums all around the world. He was also featured in the videos for the songs "Complicated" and "Sk8er Boi". Spicoluk later left the band to focus on Closet Monster and Underground Operations.

Underground Operations

Spicoluk founded Underground Operations to put out releases by his own bands, in hopes that one day they could also release other bands they knew. Originally called Underground Monkey Operations, the label released albums by Public Display and Closet Monster before becoming Underground Operations in 2002. Originally releasing albums by Toronto bands Hostage Life, Bombs Over Providence, and Marilyn's Vitamins, as well as the first of many records by Protest the Hero. By 2007 the label had released albums by The Brat Attack, Dead Letter Dept., I Hate Sally, and These Silhouettes. The next few years saw a change in sound for the label, releasing music by Aspirations, acoustic act Machete Avenue and the Juno-winning first album by Lights.  In the next few years the label released albums including Means, Kingdoms and Kathleen Turner Overdrive as well as the much loved The Holly Springs Disaster. Today the label is home to Abandon All Ships, Rob Moir, Diemonds, Skynet and Hands and Teeth. Spicoluk serves as the President/Founder.

Universal Music Canada

In 2007, Spicoluk became an A&R representative at Universal Music Canada. Eventually he became Head of A&R, overseeing the entire domestic roster, including Drake, The Tragically Hip, Down With Webster, and Hey Ocean!. During his time at Universal, Spicoluk also worked as a personal A&R for Gene Simmons, signing bands Kobra and the Lotus and The Envy to his label Simmons Records.

Cloud Empire

In 2013, Spicoluk partnered with artist manager Dan Hand to create Cloud Empire, a business collective. specializing in music, entertainment, and business services.

Television work

Spicoluk appeared for two seasons as a panelist on the Muchmusic reality show Disband. Discovering the band Stereos on the show, Spicoluk went on to manage and develop the band into one of 2011's most successful new Canadian artists. 
In 2012 Spicoluk became a judge on YTV's The Next Star, a youth-oriented singing competition along with singers Tara Oram and Keshia Chanté. In 2014, Chanté was replaced by Dan Kanter.
Spicoluk also appears on the web show From Far And Wide, which crosses Canada documenting homegrown music.

Boho Beautiful

After his career in the music industry, Spicoluk decided to retire as a musician and became more focused on changing his lifestyle. Influenced by his wife, he became more interested in traveling and yoga. In 2014, Mark and Juliana Spicoluk started a YouTube channel known as Boho Beautiful, when Mark became injured while snowboarding and decided to take up yoga for his recovery. The channel has content that focuses on the tranquility of the mind and body. Topics include yoga, fitness, pilates, guided meditation, a vegan diet, and self-awareness.

Boho Beautiful held a tour in 2017, during which the Spicoluks taught yoga classes and met with the channel's community across North America. In 2017, Mark and Juliana Spicoluk also published their first book, The Happy Healthy Plant-Based Eating Guide. In 2020, Boho Beautiful published its second book.

Boho Beautiful also has content about veganism and meditation topics.

Boho Beautiful had over 2 million subscribers on YouTube and was the third-most followed channel in the yoga category. Their videos have been mentioned in Prevention magazine, Healthline, Vogue Australia, Cosmopolitan, The South African, Men's Journal, Shape Magazine, and AsiaOne.

Closet Monster discography
So Be It - 1997
Pure Unfiltered Anarchy - 1998
A Fight For What Is Right - 1999
Where The Fuck Is Revolution? - 2000
Killed The Radio Star - 2002
We Rebuilt This City - 2004

Studio production credits

 Closet Monster – Killed the Radio Star – 2003 – producer/performance
 Protest the Hero – Search for the Truth – 2003 – producer
 Closet Monster – Re-built This City – 2005 – producer/performer
 Protest the Hero – Kezia – 2006 – executive producer
 The Brat Attack – 2006 – producer
 Chad Michael Stewart – Machete Avenue – 2008 – executive producer
 Protest the Hero – Fortress − 2008 – executive producer
 These Silhouettes – Thomas EP – 2008 – producer
 Stereos – Stereos – 2009 – executive producer/guest performer/composer
 Abandon All Ships – Geeving – 2010 – composer, producer
 Stereos – Stereos – Uncontrollable – 2010 – composer, executive producer
 The Artist Life – Impossible – 2011 – composer
 Abandon All Ships – Infamous – 2012 – producer
 DVBBS – Initio EP – 2012 – composer, producer
 Protest the Hero – A Calculated Use of Sound – producer

Music video appearances

 Closet Monster – Mr. Holland vs. Acceptable Behaviour – Performer
 Closet Monster – Corporate Media Death Squad – Performer
 Avril Lavigne – Complicated – Performer
 Avril Lavigne – Sk8er Boi – Performer
 Protest the Hero – These Colours Don't Run – Cameo
 Alexisonfire – Waterwings (And Other Poolside Fashion Faux Pas)
 Closet Monster – Mamma Anti-Fascisto – Performer
 The Brat Attack – Mr. Capitalist – Cameo
 Closet Monster – Punk Rock Ruined My Life – Performer
 Hostage Life – This Song Was Written by a Committee – Cameo
 Protest the Hero – Palms Read – Feature
 Lights – Drive My Soul – Role- The Spaceman
 Stereos – Summer Girl – Cameo
 Jhevon Paris – She Got Me – Cameo
 Stereos – She Only Likes Me When She's Drunk – Cameo
 Abandon All Ships – Geeving – Cameo

Underground Operations roster history

 Marilyn's Vitamins
 Protest the Hero
 Closet Monster
 Bombs Over Providence
 Dead Letter Dept.
 Hostage Life
 I Hate Sally
 The Brat Attack
 These Silhouettes
 Aspirations
 Kathleen Turner Overdrive
 Means
 The Holly Springs Disaster
 Lights
 Machete Avenue
 Chad Michael Stewart
 The Artist Life
 Dean Lickyer
 Sam Bradley
 Kingdoms
 Abandon All Ships
 Diemonds
 Rob Moir
 Skynet
 Hands and Teeth
 Victory, Sweet Victory!

References

External links
Underground Operations official site

1979 births
Living people
Avril Lavigne
Sum 41 members
Canadian punk rock bass guitarists
Canadian people of Ukrainian descent
A&R people
Canadian record producers
Canadian alternative rock musicians
Musicians from Edmonton
Alternative rock bass guitarists
20th-century Canadian bass guitarists
21st-century Canadian bass guitarists
20th-century Canadian male singers
21st-century Canadian male singers